Werner Hildenbrand (born 25 May 1936 in Göttingen) is a German economist and mathematician. He was educated at the University of Heidelberg, where he received his Diplom in mathematics, applied mathematics and physics in 1961. He continued his education at the University of Heidelberg and received his Ph.D. in mathematics in 1964 and his habilitation in economics and mathematics in 1968.

From 1969 to 2001, he was a professor of economics at the University of Bonn. He has held various visiting positions at, among others, the University of California, Berkeley and the University of Louvain. His research has focused on general equilibrium theory, and in particular on the existence and properties of the core of an economy.

Books 
 Core and Equilibria of a Large Economy, Princeton University Press, 1974.
 Introduction to Equilibrium Analysis, with Alan Kirman, North-Holland, 1976.
 Equilibrium Analysis, with Alan Kirman, North-Holland, 1988.
 Market Demand: Theory and Empirical Evidence, Princeton University Press, 1994.

External links 

 
Werner Hildenbrand's personal homepage at University of Bonn

References 

1936 births
Fellows of the Econometric Society
Fellows of the American Academy of Arts and Sciences
General equilibrium theorists
German economists
20th-century German mathematicians
21st-century German mathematicians
Academic staff of the University of Bonn
Gottfried Wilhelm Leibniz Prize winners
Living people